The deputy premier of Victoria is the second-most senior officer in the Government of Victoria. The deputy premier position was created in May 1932, with Robert Menzies being the first person to hold the position. The deputy premier is appointed by the Governor on the advice of the premier. The deputy premier is usually also a minister in the government.

When the Labor Party forms government, the deputy leader of the Labor parliamentary party typically becomes the deputy premier. The same was the case when the Liberal Party formed government on its own. When the Liberal-National coalition is in government, the deputy premier is usually the leader of the junior coalition partner, the Nationals (or its predecessor, the Country Party). The current deputy premier is Jacinta Allan of the Labor Party, who has held the position since 27 June 2022.

Duties
The duties of the deputy premier are to act on behalf of the premier in his or her absence overseas or on leave. The deputy premier has always been a member of the Cabinet, and has always held at least one substantive portfolio (It would be technically possible for a minister to hold only the portfolio of Deputy Premier, but this has never happened).

If the premier were to die, become incapacitated or resign, the Governor would normally appoint the deputy premier as acting Premier. If the governing or majority party had not yet elected a new leader, that appointment would be on an interim basis. Should a different leader emerge, that person would then be appointed Premier.

List of deputy premiers of Victoria

Notable careers
Among the most notable former deputy premiers of Victoria have been Robert Menzies (1932–1934) who went on to become the longest serving prime minister of Australia.
One of Menzies' federal ministers was Wilfrid Kent Hughes who like Menzies had served as deputy premier of Victoria prior to switching to federal politics. Others include Albert Dunstan (1935) who subsequently became Ppremier for a then record of ten years, Rupert Hamer (1971–1972) who later became a long serving premier, Thomas Hollway (1943–1945) who was Premier on three occasions and Joan Kirner became the first female deputy premier in 1989 before becoming the first female premier in 1990.

See also
 Premier of Victoria 
 Government of Victoria

References

 

Victoria
 
Premiers
Ministers of the Victoria (Australia) state government

fr:Premier ministre du Victoria